Blankenbach is a small river of Bavaria, Germany.

It is a left tributary of the Kahl in the district Aschaffenburg of the Bavarian Spessart.

Originally Blankenbach means as much as blinking brook. The stream gave its name to the municipality Blankenbach.

It runs through a ravine in a north-westerly direction to Kleinblankenbach (a community of Blankenbach). In front of the sports field it flows into a piping. Below the bridge Kahlbrücke, opposite the railway station of the railway , it flows into the Kahl.

See also

List of rivers of Bavaria

Rivers of Bavaria
Rivers of the Spessart
Rivers of Germany